Fimbristylis microcarya is a sedge of the family Cyperaceae that is native to Australia.

It blooms between February and July and produces brown flowers.

In Western Australia, it is found in and around swamps and claypans and along creeks and rivers in the Kimberley and Pilbara regions where it grows in brown clay-sand or red loam soils.

References

Plants described in 1859
Flora of Western Australia
microcarya
Taxa named by Ferdinand von Mueller
Endemic flora of Australia